Burry Port is a port town and community in Carmarthenshire, Wales, on the Loughor estuary (Moryd Llwchwr), to the west of Llanelli and south-east of Kidwelly. Its population was recorded at 5,680 in the 2001 census and 6,156 in the 2011 census, and estimated at 5,998 in 2019. The town has a harbour. It is also where Amelia Earhart landed as the first woman to fly across the Atlantic Ocean. Nearby are the Pembrey Burrows sand dune and wetland system, forming a country park, and the Cefn Sidan sands. Its musical heritage includes Burry Port Opera, Male Choir and Burry Port Town Band.

Etymology
The etymology of the River Burry, from which Burry Port takes its English name, is uncertain. It may derive from Old English  "fort" (cf. the ending  found in many English place names), referring to the small fort at North Hill Tor, or as it does elsewhere on the south Wales coast, to sand dunes, especially those associated with rabbit warrens (cf. the English word ). The Welsh name for the town, means "port/bay of the sand dune".

Geography
Burry Port lies 5 miles west of the town of Llanelli. It sits at the mouth of the Loughor estuary, looking south towards the picturesque Gower peninsula. West of the town's shoreline is Pembrey Burrows, a large area of burrow and marshland which historically occupied many square miles of land, much of which has later been reclaimed. To the north of the town is the hill Mynydd Donny, or Pembrey Mountain. Further north lie the Gwendraeth Valleys. The Gwendraeth Fawr runs north easterly from Kidwelly for about twelve miles (19 km). The land around the valley itself contains large amounts of coal as well as limestone. The Gwendraeth Fawr flows the length of the valley, and joins its sister river the Gwendraeth Fach west of Kidwelly before flowing into Carmarthen Bay.

Climate

Early history
Burry Port is a modern settlement, but the nearby village of Pembrey dates from the Middle Ages, as shown by the medieval tower of the Church of St Illtud. People made a living in Burry Port from farming and fishing before the industrial revolution brought the railways and collieries to the area. As Pembrey Burrows was a hazard to shipping, local people would also salvage what they could from boats wrecked in storms while navigating the Bristol Channel.

Pembrey sands have proved the final resting place of many ships, some by mishap, others it is said lured to their doom deliberately to provide plunder for the wreckers known as "Gwyr-y-Bwelli Bach" or "The Men of Little Hatchets". They were named after the locally made tool, a hatchet incorporating a claw for ripping open cargo and equally useful for dispatching unwanted witnesses to the wreckers' activities.

From the late 18th century a network of canals and then tramways grew up to carry coal from inland mines to the sea. Pembrey Harbour dates from 1819, but it proved too small and was followed by Pembrey New Harbour in 1836. This became known as Burry Port Harbour before it was completed.

Industrial history

Coal mining and the Burry Port Harbour
Records indicate that coalmining was established in the valley as early as 1540, although there was little effective transport. The Gwendraeth Fawr at the time was navigable but treacherous.

Growing interest in coal, limestone and iron ore drove the growth of the coal trade. Thomas Kymer, owner of many mining and other operations in the area established several loading places and primitive trackways to load barges on the Gwendraeth Fawr. Cargo was carried down the Gwendraeth river and then up the Towy to Carmarthen. In 1768 Kymer opened a canal and quay, part of which is today restored and preserved. The canal cut through the marshes allowing boats to travel upstream far enough to reach solid ground where quays could be built. This allowed barges to operate at all times and without having to wait for tides to get inland. A canal alone was not sufficient to solve the transport problems and wagonways were built to carry traffic from the mines to the canal itself. Several of these wagonways became plateways and then railways as technology improved.

A second canal was cut by the Earl of Ashburnham in 1798 to serve his mines nearby and this also was fed by wagonways. The canals continued to expand and wharves and dock facilities were built. More mines continued to open further up the valley sending their coal down through the canals to the sea. The trade in coal was hindered heavily however as the shifting sands made the river treacherous and the safe paths changed year by year.

In 1832, a harbour was built at Burry Port, a few years after the nearby harbour at Pembrey opened. Fed by a series of chaotic canals and wagonways it finally offered a way to ship Gwendraeth coal out by sea. Supporters of the harbour believed that its location offered considerable potential for expansion, especially as it had the advantage over neighbouring Llanelli Harbour that ships did not need to navigate the narrow channel along the Loughor estuary. In June 1838, John H. Browne, clerk to the Burry Port Harbour Company, wrote to the Cambrian newspaper drawing attention to these advantages after an article on port facilities in the South Wales Colafield failed to refer to Burry Port. In 1841, an account of the potential development of the anthracite coalfield highlighted the potential of Burry Port Harbour to accommodate larger ships than could progress through the narrow channel to the larger port at Llanelli.

No village or town of Burry Port yet existed. By 1840, the canals feeding Burry Port and their tramways fed coal from the entire Gwendraeth valley down to the sea. Early records of Burry Port as a town appear around 1850, springing up around the new docks adjacent to Pembrey. The importance of the newly emerging town was plain when the railways reached Burry Port, and the station serving both Pembrey and the new town of Burry Port was built a few hundred yards down from Pembrey at Burry Port.

The canal network was now unable to handle the loads from the Gwendraeth valley mines and part of the canal network was converted into the Burry Port and Gwendraeth Valley Railway by the late 1860s with the port continuing to grow in importance and shipping volumes. It did not, however, achieve the levels of trade that many had anticipated and went into gradual decline in the 20th century.

Copper works
In 1848 a copper works was opened on a site adjacent to the harbour, and became a major employer and a key feature in the growth of the town. The main activity centred around a smelting furnace where copper ore was roasted and melted, and having removed the impurities, the refined copper was made into ingots and sheets. The works were established by Messrs. Mason and Elkington of Birmingham and the principal chimney, at 250 feet, was described in 1853 as a principal landmark for miles around.

Carmarthen Bay Power Station

Carmarthen Bay Power Station was built on the north shore of the Burry Estuary, occupying some 220 acres. Work started on its construction in April 1947, and power was first generated on 28 June 1953. At this time the plant employed around 500 people and during its 31 years of operation the three stacks became a local landmark. The power station ceased generating in 1984, and was demolished in the early 1990s.

Present day
With the closure of all the mines at Cwm Mawr, the railways up the valley were lifted. The harbour is now a marina for small leisure craft. Pembrey and Burry Port railway station remains, with regular services east via Swansea and Cardiff to London and west into Pembrokeshire.

For shopping, the town is served by a small supermarket, specialist shops, several hairdressers, a beauty and skincare salon, and an array of pubs and fast food outlets.

The public services include a lending library and four schools. Glan-y-Mor Comprehensive School (Glan-y-Mor translates as "Seashore") has about 600 pupils. There is also a Welsh primary school – Ysgol Parc y Tywyn – and English-medium infants and junior schools in the town. It is also home to a lifeboat station, situated in Burry Port Harbour.

Burry Port lies on the Millennium Coastal Path from Bynea near Llanelli to Pembrey Burrows.

Government
Burry Port lies in the Llanelli parliamentary constituency, which has been held by the Labour Party since 1922.

Local-government representation has fluctuated between Labour dominance with occasional strong showings for local independent candidates. Labour lost control of Pembrey and Burry Port Town Council to local independents at the 2017 local elections.

Burry Port is an electoral ward for elections to Carmarthenshire County Council.

Religion
St Mary's represents the Anglican Church in Wales. Jerusalem (Congregationalist) Chapel is the survivor of several chapels built in the locality in the 19th century; the minister there for several years was the former Archdruid of Wales, Meirion Evans.

Other former nonconformist chapels that have closed in the 21st century include Tabernacle (Welsh Baptist), now a chapel of rest; Seion (Welsh Congregationalist); and Bethany (Calvinistic Methodist). A war memorial from Bethany was transferred to Bethel, Pembrey, when the chapel closed.

Amelia Earhart landing

On 17 June 1928, Amelia Earhart flew from Newfoundland as a passenger, with pilots Wilmer "Bill" Stultz and Louis "Slim" Gordon in a Fokker F.VIIa/3m named Friendship, a type of seaplane known as a floatplane. On 18 June they arrived safely in Burry Port, making her the first woman to be flown across the Atlantic. An Amelia Earhart festival was held in June 2003 to celebrate the 75th anniversary of the landing, and the event is commemorated by engraved flagstones and a plaque in the harbour.

Transport

Burry Port is connected to Llanelli and Carmarthen by the A484 road.
There are regular local buses running through Burry Port, linking it with Carmarthen, Llanelli and Swansea, with a main stop across the railway bridge from the Co-operative store. However, evening and Sunday services were withdrawn in July 2014.
Pembrey & Burry Port railway station is on the West Wales Line. Westbound services from Burry Port terminate at Carmarthen or Pembroke Dock, with less frequent direct services to Fishguard and Milford Haven. Eastbound services terminate at Swansea, or run through to Manchester via Cardiff with less frequent direct services to London Paddington. Train services operate seven days a week, including evenings. Between 1909 and 1953 Burry Port station served the town on the Burry Port and Gwendraeth Valley Railway.
Burry Port is connected to the Millennium Coastal Park, which includes a 22-km pedestrian walkway and cycle-way along the south coast of Carmarthenshire, providing a link between Bynea, Llanelli and Pembrey Country Park. The cycle-way forms a section of both the Celtic Trail cycle route (part of NCR 47) and the National Cycle Network NCR 4.
Pembrey Airport is a commercial airfield for private and charter flights, a few miles west of Burry Port. The nearest regional airport with domestic and scheduled flights is Cardiff Airport.

Burry Port tidal range
The current sea-level depths in the shipping year at Burry Port are these:

Notable people
See :Category:People from Burry Port
In birth order:
Sarah Thomas (1788-1897), Welsh centenarian
David Thomas (1880–1967), Labour organiser, adult education tutor and writer, who died in Burry Port
Linford Rees (1914–2004), psychiatrist
John Geoffrey Jones (1928–2014), British judge, president of the Mental Health Review Tribunal for England and Wales
John Gray (1936–2003), senior UK diplomat
Leslie Griffiths (born 1942), Methodist minister and Labour life peer - Baron Griffiths of Burry Port
John Owen-Jones (born 1971), musical theatre actor renowned for The Phantom in The Phantom of the Opera

Sport 
Howard Davies (1916–1987), Welsh International rugby union player
John Warlow (born 1939), Welsh rugby union and league international, Great Britain rugby league international
Gareth Jenkins (born 1951), rugby player and long-time coach for Llanelli RFC, the Scarlets; Welsh National Coach 2006–2007
Mark Perego (born 1964), Welsh international rugby union player
Darren Daniel (born 1986), rugby player
Adam Warren (born 1991), rugby union Welsh international playing for Dragons
Kirby Myhill (born 1992), rugby player for Cardiff Blues
Torin Myhill (born 1995), rugby player for Carmarthen Quins

References

External links

https://web.archive.org/web/20180628235603/http://www.burryport.org/
Film of Amelia Earhart's Plane "Friendship" Departing Burry Port for Southampton 1928

 
Towns in Carmarthenshire
Ports and harbours of Wales
Ports and harbours of the Bristol Channel
Populated coastal places in Wales